Albert Sigl (15 October 1911 – 6 November 1969) was a German sports shooter. He competed at the 1952 Summer Olympics in the 50 metre rifle, prone and 50 metre rifle three positions events. He also completed at 1956 Summer Olympics in the 50 metre rifle, prone and 50 metre rifle three positions events.

References

External links
 

1911 births
1969 deaths
German male sport shooters
Olympic shooters of Germany
Olympic shooters of the United Team of Germany
Shooters at the 1952 Summer Olympics
Shooters at the 1956 Summer Olympics
20th-century German people